Colin Salmon (born ) is a British actor. He is known for playing Charles Robinson in three James Bond films and James "One" Shade in the Resident Evil film series. He has had roles on many television series such as Doctor Who, Merlin, Arrow, and The Musketeers. He also played General Zod on the Syfy series Krypton and provided his voice and likeness as Agent Carson in the PlayStation VR video game Blood & Truth.

Early life
Salmon was born in Bethnal Green, London, England, the son of Sylvia Ivy Brudenell Salmon, a nurse. He is of Jamaican descent. He grew up in Luton and attended Ramridge Primary School, Ashcroft High School. and Luton Sixth Form College.

On leaving school, Salmon became the drummer in the punk rock band the Friction, which he formed along with three friends from Ashcroft High School. The band released a 7-inch EP, a live cassette, a cassette-EP and performed regularly around Luton in 1979 and 1980. Salmon briefly worked with another band, the Tee Vees, and was also a singer and trumpeter in Luton-based band Catch in the mid-1980s. He plays trumpet and has his own jazz quartet, playing at venues such as the Dorchester Grill Room and at events such as the Cheltenham Jazz Festival.

Speaking about his quartet to noted British jazz/soul writer Pete Lewis of the award-winning magazine Blues & Soul, in a rare music-themed interview prior to their performance at the Cheltenham Jazz Festival in May 2008, Salmon stated:

Career
Salmon is known for his role as Charles Robinson, a character in the James Bond films Tomorrow Never Dies, The World Is Not Enough and Die Another Day. He made his feature debut in 1992 as Sgt. Robert Oswald in the British mini-series Prime Suspect 2. Salmon also played Note Makoti in the No. 1 Ladies' Detective Agency and David Tyrel in the Sky One UK television series Hex. He appears as himself in the sixth episode of the BBC Three comedy, Little Miss Jocelyn.

In 2006 he appeared in the eighth series of ITV drama Bad Girls as Senior Medical Officer Dr. Rowan Dunlop. He played Dr. Moon in two episodes ("Silence in the Library" and "Forest of the Dead") of the fourth series of the long running science fiction television series Doctor Who. (Subsequently, there were rumours that he would take on the coveted lead role of The Doctor in 2008 after David Tennant, but the role went to Matt Smith.) In 2020, writer Steven Moffat stated he envisioned Salmon's character as a future incarnation of the Doctor.
Salmon has also recorded the role of Kerr Avon in the new audio series of Blake's 7.

Salmon has worked twice with director Paul W. S. Anderson; appearing in the films Resident Evil and Alien vs. Predator, in both of which Salmon's character meets a grisly end (in fact, a very similar end in both; both characters are sliced into small, criss-crossed chunks). He reprised his role as a clone version of One in the 2012 film Resident Evil: Retribution, alongside Michelle Rodriguez and Oded Fehr.

Salmon also played Oonu, squad leader of the Skybax in the 2002 mini-series Dinotopia. His other film credits include Captives (1994), Frantz Fanon: Black Skin White Mask (a documentary directed by Isaac Julien in which Salmon plays the French psychiatrist, philosopher and revolutionary, Frantz Fanon) (1996), The Wisdom of Crocodiles (1998), Fanny and Elvis (1999) and My Kingdom (2001).

In 2007, Salmon appeared in the season finale of the ITV2 series Secret Diary of a Call Girl, playing a client of the protagonist, a call girl named Hannah Baxter. In the 2008 film Clubbed, a film about nightclub bouncers in Coventry in the 1980s, Salmon plays one of the main characters, Louis. In the same year he appeared in The Bank Job as Hakim Jamal.

In 2009, Salmon appeared in the UK version of the popular American drama Law & Order, as barrister Doug Greer in the episodes "Buried" and "Community Service". In 2012, Salmon appeared in Death in Paradise, as killer/businessman Leon Hamilton/Vincent Carter

He starred in the thriller film Exam, directed by Stuart Hazeldine.

Salmon was one of the celebrity contestants on the tenth series of BBC One's Strictly Come Dancing, partnered with professional dancer Kristina Rihanoff. He was eliminated as a result of the "dance-off" in Week 5, in which he competed against Richard Arnold.

In 2015, he played a fictional version of himself in the Netflix series Master of None, alongside Aziz Ansari's main character. On 9 May 2015, Salmon gave a reading at VE Day 70: A Party to Remember in Horse Guards Parade, London. In 2018, he portrayed the role of Chudleigh Pomeroy in Mortal Engines.

Personal life
Salmon is a patron of the African-Caribbean Leukaemia Trust and the Richard House Children's Hospice and an ambassador for The Prince's Trust. He is also the chairman of governors at St Anne's Nursery. He is involved in the Notting Hill Carnival and is the dance captain of the Fox Carnival Band.

Salmon married visual artist Fiona Hawthorne in 1988 and the couple have four children: Sasha, Rudi, Eden and Ben.

In September 2010, Salmon was invited by his friend Samuel L. Jackson to Switzerland for Shooting Stars Benefits 2010 Golf Tournaments. The golf competition raised money for the Samuel L. Jackson Foundation and the Swiss Red Cross to go towards a new hospital in Takéo Province, one of Cambodia's poorest provinces. In 2009 he became a co-founder of Cage Cricket with Trevor McArdle.

Salmon is a fan of Luton Town F.C.

In an August 2021 interview, Salmon spoke out about how becoming ill with COVID-19 had affected him and his family, praising doctors for having saved his life.

Filmography

Film

Television

Voice Work

References

External links 

 
 

1962 births
Living people
20th-century English male actors
21st-century English male actors
Actors from Luton
Black British male actors
English male film actors
English male stage actors
English male television actors
English male voice actors
English people of Jamaican descent
Male actors from Bedfordshire
Male actors from London
People educated at Ashcroft High School
People from Bethnal Green
People from Luton